David Paul Dobkin is an American computer scientist and the Phillip Y. Goldman '86 Professor of Computer Science at Princeton University.  His research has concerned computational geometry and computer graphics.

Early life and education
Dobkin was born February 29, 1948, in Pittsburgh, Pennsylvania. He received a B.S. from the Massachusetts Institute of Technology in 1970 and then moved to Harvard University for his graduate studies, receiving a Ph.D. in applied mathematics in 1973 under the supervision of Roger W. Brockett.

Career
He taught at Yale University and the University of Arizona before moving to Princeton in 1981. He was initially appointed to the Department of Electrical Engineering and Computer Science at Princeton and was subsequently named one of the first professors of Computer Science when that department was formed in 1985. In 1999, he became the first holder of the Goldman chair after its namesake donated two million dollars to the university. He was chair of the Computer Science Department at Princeton from 1994 to 2003, and in 2003 was appointed Dean of the Faculty. David Dobkin also chaired the governing board of The Geometry Center, a NSF-established research and education center at the University of Minnesota.

Dobkin has been on the editorial boards of eight journals.

Recognition
In 1997 he was selected as a Fellow of the Association for Computing Machinery for his contributions to both fields.

References

Further reading
 Dobkin keeps pace with faculty interests, Princeton Weekly Bulletin, January 9, 2006

External links
 Dobkin's web site at the Princeton Computer Science department
 Dobkin's publications at DBLP

1948 births
Living people
Massachusetts Institute of Technology alumni
Harvard University alumni
Yale University faculty
University of Arizona faculty
Princeton University faculty
American computer scientists
Researchers in geometric algorithms
Computer graphics researchers
Fellows of the Association for Computing Machinery
Taylor Allderdice High School alumni
Fulbright alumni